Amidža Konak (from  meaning "uncle". ) is a 19th-century residence of Turkish-style architecture located in the old part of the city of Kragujevac in central Serbia. It was built in 1819-1824 by Serbian Prince Miloš Obrenović, and it was named after Sima Milosavljević-Paštrmac, called Amidža, a Serbian hajduk and staff member of the court of Obrenović. Only Amidža Konak remained from large complex of building that existed during Miloš Obrenović time. Nearby, Miloš's Konak existed, and it was destroyed in 1941, during World War II, and also, Princess Ljubica Konak, that burned down in 1884.

Amidža Konak served as a residence of Sima and his colleagues that passed through Kragujevac, and now serves as a national museum.

It is part of Cultural Monuments of Great Importance.

See also
Kragujevac
Tourism in Serbia

References

Manor houses in Serbia
Palaces in Serbia
Ottoman architecture in Serbia
Buildings and structures in Kragujevac
Tourism in Serbia
Cultural Monuments of Great Importance (Serbia)